The 2009 NASCAR Corona Series was the sixth season of the Corona Series, which was sanctioned by NASCAR Mexico.

New for this season
All five previous NASCAR Mexico series champions raced the full schedule in 2009.

The Rookie of the Year championship adopted a points system similar to those used in NASCAR's national series, with points going from ten to one for rookies only, and bonus points for top-ten finishes in the overall race.

Drivers
These are the entries for the 2009 season.

2009 calendar

The race calendar for this season and results is as follows: In this season was inaugurated the Autódromo Internacional de Aguascalientes with the first race of the season.

Results

Races

1Qualifying cancelled by rain.
2Qualifying cancelled by rain.
3Posthumous victory.
4Qualifying cancelled by rain.

Standings

(key) Bold - Pole position awarded by time. Italics - Pole position set by final practice results or rainout. * – Most laps led.

Rookie of the Year

Only the best 10 results count in the final classification.

See also
2009 NASCAR Sprint Cup Series
2009 NASCAR Nationwide Series
2009 NASCAR Camping World Truck Series
2009 NASCAR Camping World East Series
2009 NASCAR Camping World West Series
2009 NASCAR Canadian Tire Series
2009 NASCAR Mini Stock Series

References

NASCAR Corona Series

NASCAR Mexico Series